Vagheshwar is a village in Mawal taluka of Pune district in the state of Maharashtra, India.

Administration
The village is administrated by a sarpanch, an elected representative who leads a gram panchayat. At the time of the 2011 Census of India, the gram panchayat governed three villages and was based at Shilimb.

Demographics
At the 2011 census, the village comprised 48 households. The population of 284 was split between 148 males and 136 females.

See also
List of villages in Mawal taluka

References

Villages in Mawal taluka